Júlio César Rocha (born October 22, 1979 in São Paulo) is a Brazilian actor.

Biography 

He studied at the Theatre School Célia Helena, attended the Anhembi Morumbi University, studied at the Actors School Wolf Maya in São Paulo and New York Film Academy in New York City.

The actor began his career at age 15 when he participated in "ballet in the curve". From there, he appeared in "Our family life", "The case of the ten darkies", "Rise and Fall of the City of Mahagonny", "Patty Diphusa Pedro Almodovar," "Beware, boy love," Toni Brandão, that won the APCA award for best juvenile play in 1997.

On television he had a prominent role as the character "João Batista" in the novel Duas Caras and currently as the mysterious "Enzo" of Fina Estampa.

In 2013, Rocha return to the novels Amor à Vida, the plot it interprets Jacques.

Filmography

Television

Film 

 2009 – Não Me Deixe em Casa – Short film
 2011 – Eu odeio o Orkut – Giácomo

References

External links 

1979 births
Living people
Male actors from São Paulo
Brazilian male television actors
Brazilian male telenovela actors
Brazilian male film actors
Brazilian male stage actors
20th-century Brazilian male actors
21st-century Brazilian male actors